Pine Flat is a census-designated place (CDP) in Tulare County, California. The 2010 United States census reported Pine Flat's population was 166.

Geography
According to the United States Census Bureau, the CDP covers an area of 1.2 square miles (3.0 km), all of it land.

Demographics
At the 2010 census Pine Flat had a population of 166. The racial makeup of Pine Flat was 158 (95.2%) White, 0 (0.0%) African American, 3 (1.8%) Native American, 3 (1.8%) Asian, 0 (0.0%) Pacific Islander, 0 (0.0%) from other races, and 2 (1.2%) from two or more races. Hispanic or Latino of any race were 11 people (6.6%).

The whole population lived in households, no one lived in non-institutionalized group quarters and no one was institutionalized.

There were 81 households, 17 (21.0%) had children under the age of 18 living in them, 43 (53.1%) were opposite-sex married couples living together, 4 (4.9%) had a female householder with no husband present, 0 (0%) had a male householder with no wife present.  There were 1 (1.2%) unmarried opposite-sex partnerships, and 0 (0%) same-sex married couples or partnerships. 31 households (38.3%) were one person and 10 (12.3%) had someone living alone who was 65 or older. The average household size was 2.05.  There were 47 families (58.0% of households); the average family size was 2.70.

The age distribution was 32 people (19.3%) under the age of 18, 1 people (0.6%) aged 18 to 24, 24 people (14.5%) aged 25 to 44, 59 people (35.5%) aged 45 to 64, and 50 people (30.1%) who were 65 or older.  The median age was 54.3 years. For every 100 females, there were 104.9 males.  For every 100 females age 18 and over, there were 103.0 males.

There were 272 housing units at an average density of 234.1 per square mile, of the occupied units 66 (81.5%) were owner-occupied and 15 (18.5%) were rented. The homeowner vacancy rate was 4.3%; the rental vacancy rate was 6.3%.  141 people (84.9% of the population) lived in owner-occupied housing units and 25 people (15.1%) lived in rental housing units.

References

Census-designated places in Tulare County, California
Census-designated places in California